Miracle is an EP by The Original Wailers released by MRG Recordings on April 10, 2012.

Track listing

Personnel
Musicians
Al Anderson: Lead guitar, background vocals, percussion
Desi Hyson: Lead vocals, organ, piano, synthesizer
Steve Samuels: Bass guitar
'Paapa' Nyarkoh: Drums, percussion
Erica Newell: Background vocals and lead vocals on "Our Day Will Come"
Special guest: Martin Bastista - Keyboards

Additional personnel
Produced by Al Anderson and Karl Pitterson
Recorded and engineered by Karl Pitterson at Clubhouse Studio in Rhinebeck, New York
Mixed by Karl Pitterson, Jason Corsaro, and Al Anderson.
Mastered by Tom Ryan at Gateway Mastering, Portland, Maine

2012 EPs
Reggae EPs